Chandra Shekhar was sworn in as Prime Minister of India on 10 November 1990.

Cabinet

|}

Ministers of State (Independent Charge) 

 Maneka Gandhi, Minister of State (Independent Charge) of the Ministry of Environment & Forests.
 Sanjaya Sinh, Minister of State (Independent Charge) of the Ministry of Communications.
 Harmohan Dhawan, Minister of State (Independent Charge) of the Ministry of Civil Aviations.

Ministers of State
 Jagdeep Dhankhar, Minister of state for Parliamentary Affairs.
 Bhakta Charan Das, Minister of State for Railways.
 Kamal Morarka, Minister of State for Prime Minister's Office.
 Jayantilal Shah, Minister of State for Agriculture and Co-operation.
 Lalit Vijay Singh, Minister of State for Defence.
Subodh Kant Sahay, Minister of State in Ministry of Home Affairs and Ministry of Information and Broadcasting.
Bhagey Gobardhan, Minister of State in the Ministry of Railways.
Usha Singh, Minister of State in the Ministry of Tourism.
Sarwar Hussain, Minister of State in the Ministry of Food and Civil supplies.
Ram Ji Lal Suman, Minister of State in the Ministry of Labour and Ministry of Welfare.
Babanrao Dhakne, Minister of State in the Ministry of Energy.
Basavaraj Patil Anwari, Minister of State in the Ministry of Steel and Mines.
Ram Bahadur Singh, Minister of State in the Ministry of Agriculture.

Deputy Ministers 

 Shantilal Patel, Deputy Minister in Ministry of Commerce.
 Dasai Chowdhary, Deputy Minister in Ministry of Health and Family Welfare.
 Digvijay Singh, Deputy Minister in Ministry of Finance.
 Jai Parkash, Deputy Minister in Ministry of Petroleum and Chemicals.

References

Indian union ministries
Chandra Shekhar administration
1990 establishments in India
1991 disestablishments in India
Cabinets established in 1990
Cabinets disestablished in 1991
Samajwadi Janata Party (Rashtriya)
Janata Party